Dysschema hilarum is a moth of the family Erebidae first described by Weymer in 1895. It is found in Brazil.

It is a variable species. The ground colour of the hindwings is pale yellow to purple, ranging to nearly all brown in females.

References

Moths described in 1895
Dysschema